In Action! is Johnny Rivers's third official album and first studio album. The album reached number 42 on the Billboard charts with "Mountain of Love" released as a single, reaching number nine on the Billboard Hot 100.

Track listing
 "Mountain of Love" (Harold Dorman) – 2:36
 "Promised Land" (Chuck Berry) – 2:34
 "I Should Have Known Better"  (Lennon–McCartney) – 3:22
 "I'm in Love Again" (Fats Domino, Dave Bartholomew) – 1:53
 "Rhythm of the Rain" (The Cascades) – 2:17
 "He Don't Love You Like I Love You" (Jerry Butler, Calvin Carter, Curtis Mayfield) – 3:04
 "Cupid" (Sam Cooke) – 2:32
 "Oh, Pretty Woman" (Roy Orbison) – 2:49
 "It's All Over Now" (Bobby Womack, Shirley Womack) – 2:40
 "What Am I Doing Here With You" (P.F. Sloan, Steve Barri) – 2:28
 "Moody River" (Pat Boone) – 2:44
 "Keep A-Knockin'" (Little Richard's rendition of the Perry Bradford song) – 2:18

Personnel

Musicians
 Johnny Rivers – guitar
 Joe Osborn – bass
 Mickey Jones – drums

Technical
 Lou Adler – producer
 Bones Howe – engineer
 Studio Five – design
 David Chan – photography
 Steve McQueen – liner notes

References

External links
 Johnny Rivers Official Website Discography 1964-1969
 AllMusic Web Page for P.F. Sloan

1964 albums
Johnny Rivers albums
Albums produced by Lou Adler
Albums recorded at United Western Recorders
Imperial Records albums